The 1975 Commonwealth Heads of Government Meeting, officially known as the III Commonwealth Heads Meeting, and commonly known as Kingston 1975, was the third Meeting of the Heads of Government of the Commonwealth of Nations.  It was held from 29 April to 6 May 1975 in Kingston, Jamaica, and was hosted by that country's Prime Minister, Michael Manley. 

Among the topics discussed were nuclear disarmament, the situation in Rhodesia, South Africa and decolonization in Southern Africa, the Turkish invasion and occupation of northern Cyprus, the end of the Vietnam War, the aftermath of the war between Bangladesh and Pakistan and other regional issues.

References
 

1975
20th-century diplomatic conferences
1975 in international relations
Jamaica and the Commonwealth of Nations
20th century in Kingston, Jamaica
1975 conferences
April 1975 events in North America
May 1975 events in North America